The Bad Plus (also known as Motel) is the eponymous first album released by The Bad Plus.

Background
It contains covers of ABBA's "Knowing Me, Knowing You," Rodgers and Hart's 1934 classic "Blue Moon," and Nirvana's "Smells Like Teen Spirit."  It was recorded on December 28, 2000, and released in 2001 on the Fresh Sound New Talent label.

Track listing 
 "Knowing Me, Knowing You" (ABBA) – 5:45
 "Blue Moon" (Richard Rodgers, Lorenz Hart) – 3:01
 "1972 Bronze Medalist" (David King) – 5:06
 "The Breakout" (Reid Anderson) – 5:22
 "Smells Like Teen Spirit" (Kurt Cobain, Dave Grohl, Krist Novoselic) – 6:32
 "Labyrinth" (Ethan Iverson) – 5:13
 "Scurry" (Iverson) – 5:22
 "Love Is the Answer" (Anderson) – 8:22

Personnel 
 Ethan Iverson – piano
 Reid Anderson – acoustic bass
 David King – drums
 Jordi Pujol – executive producer

References 

2001 debut albums
The Bad Plus albums